Shivam is a 2002 Indian Malayalam-language action film directed by Shaji Kailas, written by B. Unnikrishnan and produced by Menaka under the production banner Revathy Kalamandhir. Biju Menon appears in the leading role as Bhadran K. Menon, a tough police officer, who is on a fight against Medayil Devarajan, a smuggler-cum-politician (Sai Kumar). Kausalya, Ratheesh, Vijayakumar Rajan P. Dev, N. F. Varghese, Subair, T. P. Madhavan, Baburaj, and Babu Namboothiri appears in other prominent roles.

The film was based on the true story of man named Shivam Kapoor. As it was produced at a very small budget within a short period, this film was successful in covering the production cost.

Cast
 Biju Menon as CI Bhadran K. Menon
 Sai Kumar as Medayil Devarajan
 Nandini as Dr Gayathri
 Vijayakumar as Constable Rasheed	
 Murali as Sudhakaran MP
 Ratheesh as Umman Koshi
 NF Varghese as Constable Sukumaran Nair
 Rajan P. Dev as S.I Eapen 
 Baburaj as Medayil Ashokan	
 Babu Namboothiri as Kumarji
 Subair as Sadanandan	
 James  as Constable Varghese
 Ambika Nair	
 Baby Indu	
 Jayashankar	
 Jijoy Rajagopal as Francis
 Master Arun		
 P. Balachandran as Padmanabhan
 Paravoor Ramachandran as Somarajan
 TP Madhavan as Yashodharan
 Praseetha Menon
 Gopika Anil
 Subhash Nair

References

External links

2002 films
2000s Malayalam-language films
Fictional portrayals of the Kerala Police
Films directed by Shaji Kailas